Françoise Vergès (born 23 January 1952) is a French political scientist, historian, film producer, independent curator, activist and public educator. Her work focuses on postcolonial studies and decolonial feminism.

Vergès was born in Paris, grew up in Réunion and Algeria, before returning to Paris to study and become a journalist. She moved to the US in 1983, studying at the University of California, San Diego and Berkeley.

Vergès' book A Decolonial Feminism was published in English in 2021, translated by Ashley J. Bohrer along with Vergès, with the support of an English PEN Translates award.

Career 
Françoise Vergès was a journalist and editor at Panthéon-Sorbonne University.

She holds a PhD in Political Science, from the University of California, Berkeley in May 1995, a thesis published under the title Monsters and revolutionaries: Colonial family romance and grooming. She took as a plot the political history of Réunion from its origins to the present day, to trace the journey of her family engaged in politics since 1930.

In 1996, she taught at University of Sussex, and was a member of the political science department at the Center for Cultural Studies at Goldsmiths, University of London. She studies the problem of colonial slavery and the phenomena of creolization using political theories using postcolonial logic.

After being vice-president, Françoise Vergès became, on 13 February 2008, replacing Maryse Condé, the president of the National Committee for the memory and history of slavery. A decree of 10 May 2009 names her as Chairperson of the National Committee for the Memory and History of Slavery.

In 2009, she is an "expert", within the framework of the Overseas Estates General.

She is also, for several years, the scientific director of the Réunion Cultural Center (MCUR). Her appointment, as well as the project itself, are subject to debate in Réunion society. On the 3rd, the journalist Pierrot Dupuy filed a civil suit against Paul Vergès for having appointed his daughter to the management, which would constitute, according to him, a conflict of interest. It seems that the call for candidatures to the head of the MCUR had been unsuccessful, and to date, the illegal nature of the appointment of Françoise Vergès is not proven. Regarding the scientific project of the MCUR, the Commission of public inquiry gives in its report of 19 February 2010 to the prefect Michel Lalande a favorable opinion. On the 21st, the strong opposition to the MCUR project, which was expressed at the polls, as well as the victory of the party led by Didier Robert to the Réunion Regional Council, led to the end of the MCUR project. Upon his election, in accordance with his program, Didier Robert announced the end of the MCUR project.

On 10 May 2017, Françoise Vergès was appointed to the  "Mission of the memory of slavery, treaties and their abolitions" public interest group.

Feminism 
A feminist activist, Françoise Vergès collaborated with the journal Women in Motion, a monthly and weekly, published between 1978 and 1982, and with the collection "Women in struggle of all countries", at Éditions des femmes, from 1981 to 1983. Leading her feminist and anti-racist struggles, Françoise Vergès has collaborated with the association Rualité created by the hip-hop artist Bintou Dembélé.

She is a member of the MAFED (Collective of the March of Women for Dignity), a group that the political scientist Laurent de Boissieu located in the political field of racialism and defines as close to the Indigenous Party of the Republic. She is also a member of the College of Diversity at the Ministry of Culture and a founding member of the Decolonizing the Arts collective.

Françoise Vergès signed the calls to the Marches for Justice and Dignity, as well as a large number of petitions defending differentialist and "decolonial" positions, including "Stop the Cyberbullying Against the Controversial Lallab Association"; "Against media lynching and slanderous anti-racists"; an intolerable persecution against the Traore family ";" We can disagree with the ideas of Houria Bouteldja, so let's debate ";" For the continuation of the Fight against Islamophobia conference", the petition of support to Sonia Nour following her statements relating a terrorist to a martyr, the petition of support to Tariq Ramadan indicted for rape, accusing the French justice of unequal treatment and / or racism, along with Houria Bouteldja, Sihame Assbague, Marwan Muhammad, Alain Gresh, Nabil Ennasri and François Burgat.

Works 

 De l'Esclave au citoyen, avec Philippe Haudrère, Paris, Gallimard, 1998, coll. " Découvertes Gallimard Texto ", (traduit en chinois simplifié, 2006)
 Monsters and revolutionaries. Colonial family romance and "métissage", Duke University Press, 1999
 Abolir l'esclavage. Une utopie coloniale, les ambiguïtés d'une politique humanitaire, Paris, Albin Michel, 2001
 Racines et itinéraires de l'unité réunionnaise. La Réunion, Graphica-Région Réunion, 2003
 Amarres. Créolisations india-océanes, avec Jean-Claude Carpanin Marimoutou, Paris, Ka, 2003; Paris, L'Harmattan, 2005
 La Mémoire enchaînée. Questions sur l'esclavage, Paris, Albin Michel, 2006
 La République coloniale. Essai sur une utopie, avec Pascal Blanchard et Nicolas Bancel, Paris, Hachette, 2006, coll. " Pluriel »
 Nègre, je suis, Nègre je resterai. Entretiens avec Aimé Césaire, Paris, Albin Michel, 2007
 La Colonisation française, avec Nicolas Bancel et Pascal Blanchard, Toulouse, Éditions Milan, coll. " Les Esentiels ", 2007
 Nègre. Nègrier. Traite des nègres. Trois articles du Grand Dictionnaire universel de Pierre Larousse, Saint-Pourçain, Bleu autour, 2007
 Fractures postcoloniales, avec Nicolas Bancel, Pascal Blanchard et Achille Mbembe, Paris, La Découverte, 2010
 L'Homme prédateur, ce que nous enseigne l'esclavage sur notre temps, Paris, Albin Michel, 2011, coll. " Bibliothèque Idées »
Le ventre des femmes, Capitalisme, racialisation, féminisme, Paris, La fabrique éditions, 2017
Un féminisme décolonial, Paris, La fabrique éditions, 2019

Works in English
 Monsters and Revolutionaries: Colonial Family Romance and Métissage, Duke University Press, 1999, 
Rod Edmondm Vanessa Smith {eds} "The Island of Wandering Souls : Processes of Creolization, Politics of Emancipation and the Problematic of Absence on Reunion Island", Islands in History and Representation, Routledge, 2003. 
The Wombs of Women: Race, Capital, Feminism, Duke University Press, 2020, translated and with introduction by Kaiama L. Glover, 
A Decolonial Feminism, Pluto Books, 2021, translated by Ashley J. Bohrer

References

External links 

1952 births
Living people
Feminism in France
Historians of slavery
French political scientists
Academics of the University of Sussex
University of California, San Diego alumni
UC Berkeley College of Letters and Science alumni
Journalists from Paris
Women political scientists